Potporanj is a village in Serbia. It is situated in the Vršac municipality, in the South Banat District, Vojvodina province. The village has a Serb ethnic majority (94.21%) and its population numbering 273 people (2002 census).

Sources
 Letopis Opština u južnom Banatu: Banatska mesta i običaji, Marina M.(Beč 1999)
 Mileker, Feliks, 2005: Milekerovi letopisi Opština u južnom Banatu 

Vršac
Populated places in Serbian Banat
Populated places in South Banat District